Trails of Adventure is a 1933 American Western film directed by Jay Wilsey and starring Wilsey, Edna Aslin and Harry Carter.

Cast
 Jay Wilsey as Bill Merritt 
 Edna Aslin as Jane Gordon 
 Harry Carter as 'Ace' Carter 
 Allen Holbrook as Fred Kane 
 Raymond Wells as Jim Gordon 
 Belle D'Arcy as Mrs. Gordon 
 N.E. Hendrix as Hack Harris 
 Victor Adamson as Henchman 
 Ken Broeker as Sheriff

References

Bibliography
 Michael R. Pitts. Poverty Row Studios, 1929–1940: An Illustrated History of 55 Independent Film Companies, with a Filmography for Each. McFarland & Company, 2005.

External links
 

1933 films
1933 Western (genre) films
American Western (genre) films
1930s English-language films
1930s American films